Dowlow Halt was opened in 1920 between Dowlow (hill now largely quarried away) and Greatlow to the south east of Buxton, Derbyshire on the London and North Western Railway line to Ashbourne and the south.

History
The line utilised part of the Cromford and High Peak Railway (which ran from Whaley Bridge to Cromford) joining it near Hindlow and proceeding to a branch to Ashbourne at Parsley Hay.

After leaving Hindlow the line began to climb at 1 in 60 through Hindlow Tunnel to Brigg's Sidings and its summit at Dowlow Halt.  at the summit, this was the highest main line in England at the time. From Dowlow Halt the line travelled downhill at a gradient of 1 in 60 to Hurdlow.

Brigg's Sidings served Messrs. Briggs and the Dowlow Lime and Stone Company (later Steetley, then Redland Aggregates).

The halt itself was unstaffed with two short stone platforms and without buildings, since it was initially used by workmen's trains for the nearby works. It was opened for public services in November 1929. Passenger services on the line finished in 1954.

One section still exists, serving Buxton Lime Industries, and terminating a short distance further on at the Lafarge Dowlow sidings.

Route

See also
 Cromford and High Peak Railway

References

Bibliography
 Bentley, J.M., Fox, G.K., (1997) Railways of the High Peak: Buxton to Ashbourne (Scenes From The Past series 32), Romiley: Foxline Publishing

Disused railway stations in Derbyshire
Peak District
Railway stations in Great Britain opened in 1929
Railway stations in Great Britain closed in 1954
Former London and North Western Railway stations